Prokino is a rural locality (a village) in Piksimovskoye Rural Settlement, Vashkinsky District, Vologda Oblast, Russia. The population was 27 as of 2002. There are 2 streets.

Geography 
Prokino is located 42 km northwest of Lipin Bor (the district's administrative centre) by road. Piksimovo is the nearest rural locality.

References 

Rural localities in Vashkinsky District